The XXVII Golden Grand Prix Ivan Yarygin 2016, also known as Ivan Yarygin 2016 were held in Krasnoyarsk, Russia between 29 and 31 January 2016.

The international tournament included competition in both men and women's freestyle wrestling. The Grand Prix is held in honor of 2-time Olympic Champion Ivan Yarygin.

Medal overview

Medal table

Men's freestyle results

Women's freestyle results

Participating nations

 
 

 
 
 
 (without ethnics & Islamic republics)

References

External links 
 https://unitedworldwrestling.org/event/ivan-yariguin-1
 http://www.wrestrus.ru/news/Novosti_turnirov/gran_pri_ivan_yarigin_2016/jarigin_2016_rezul_tati_pervogo_dnja_ob1novljaetsja 

Golden Grand Prix Ivan Yarygin
Golden Grand Prix Ivan Yarygin
2016 in sport wrestling